Tyrosine-protein phosphatase non-receptor type 11 (PTPN11) also known as protein-tyrosine phosphatase 1D (PTP-1D), Src homology region 2 domain-containing phosphatase-2 (SHP-2), or protein-tyrosine phosphatase 2C (PTP-2C) is an enzyme that in humans is encoded by the PTPN11 gene. PTPN11 is a protein tyrosine phosphatase (PTP) Shp2.

PTPN11 is a member of the protein tyrosine phosphatase (PTP) family. PTPs are known to be signaling molecules that regulate a variety of cellular processes including cell growth, differentiation, mitotic cycle, and oncogenic transformation. This PTP contains two tandem Src homology-2 domains, which function as phospho-tyrosine binding domains and mediate the interaction of this PTP with its substrates. This PTP is widely expressed in most tissues and plays a regulatory role in various cell signaling events that are important for a diversity of cell functions, such as mitogenic activation, metabolic control, transcription regulation, and cell migration. Mutations in this gene are a cause of Noonan syndrome as well as acute myeloid leukemia.

Structure and function
This phosphatase, along with its paralogue, Shp1, possesses a domain structure that consists of two tandem SH2 domains in its N-terminus followed by a protein tyrosine phosphatase (PTP) domain.  In the inactive state, the N-terminal SH2 domain binds the PTP domain and blocks access of potential substrates to the active site.  Thus, Shp2 is auto-inhibited.

Upon binding to target phospho-tyrosyl residues, the N-terminal SH2 domain is released from the PTP domain, catalytically activating the enzyme by relieving this auto-inhibition.

Genetic diseases associated with PTPN11
Missense mutations in the PTPN11 locus are associated with both Noonan syndrome and Leopard syndrome. At least 79 disease-causing mutations in this gene have been discovered. 

It has also been associated with Metachondromatosis.

Noonan syndrome
In the case of Noonan syndrome, mutations are broadly distributed throughout the coding region of the gene but all appear to result in hyper-activated, or unregulated mutant forms of the protein.  Most of these mutations disrupt the binding interface between the N-SH2 domain and catalytic core necessary for the enzyme to maintain its auto-inhibited conformation.

Leopard syndrome
The mutations that cause Leopard syndrome are restricted regions affecting the catalytic core of the enzyme producing catalytically impaired Shp2 variants. It is currently unclear how mutations that give rise to mutant variants of Shp2 with biochemically opposite characteristics result in similar human genetic syndromes.

Cancer associated with PTPN11
Patients with a subset of Noonan syndrome PTPN11 mutations also have a higher prevalence of juvenile myelomonocytic leukemias (JMML). Activating Shp2 mutations have also been detected in neuroblastoma, melanoma, acute myeloid leukemia, breast cancer, lung cancer, colorectal cancer. Recently, a relatively high prevalence of PTPN11 mutations (24%) were detected by next-generation sequencing in a cohort of NPM1-mutated acute myeloid leukemia patients, although the prognostic significance of such associations has not been clarified. These data suggests that Shp2 may be a proto-oncogene. However, it has been reported that PTPN11/Shp2 can act as either tumor promoter or suppressor. In aged mouse model, hepatocyte-specific deletion of PTPN11/Shp2 promotes inflammatory signaling through the STAT3 pathway and hepatic inflammation/necrosis, resulting in regenerative hyperplasia and spontaneous development of tumors.  Decreased PTPN11/Shp2 expression was detected in a subfraction of human hepatocellular carcinoma (HCC) specimens. The bacterium Helicobacter pylori has been associated with gastric cancer, and this is thought to be mediated in part by the interaction of its virulence factor CagA with SHP2.

Interactions 
PTPN11 has been shown to interact with

CagA,
 Cbl gene,
 CD117,
 CD31,
 CEACAM1,
 Epidermal growth factor receptor,
 Erk
 FRS2,
 GAB1,
 GAB2,
 GAB3, 
 Glycoprotein 130,
 Grb2,
 Growth hormone receptor,
 HoxA10,
 Insulin receptor,
 Insulin-like growth factor 1 receptor,
 IRS1,
 Janus kinase 1,
 Janus kinase 2,
 LAIR1,
 LRP1,
 PDGFRB,
 PI3K → Akt
 PLCG2,
 PTK2B,
 Ras
 SLAMF1,
 SOCS3,
 SOS1,
 STAT3,
 STAT5A, and
 STAT5B.

H Pylori CagA virulence factor
CagA is a protein and virulence factor inserted by Helicobacter pylori into gastric epithelia. Once activated by SRC phosphorylation, CagA binds to SHP2, allosterically activating it. This leads to morphological changes, abnormal mitogenic signals and sustained activity can result in apoptosis of the host cell. Epidemiological studies have shown roles of cagA- positive H. pylori in the development of atrophic gastritis, peptic ulcer disease and gastric carcinoma.

References

Further reading

External links 
  GeneReviews/NCBI/NIH/UW entry on Noonan syndrome

EC 3.1.3